In numerical analysis, the quasi-Monte Carlo method is a method for numerical integration and solving some other problems using low-discrepancy sequences (also called quasi-random sequences or sub-random sequences). This is in contrast to the regular Monte Carlo method or Monte Carlo integration, which are based on sequences of pseudorandom numbers.

Monte Carlo and quasi-Monte Carlo methods are stated in a similar way.
The problem is to approximate the integral of a function f as the average of the function evaluated at a set of points x1, ..., xN:

Since we are integrating over the s-dimensional unit cube, each xi is a vector of s elements. The difference between quasi-Monte Carlo and Monte Carlo is the way the xi are chosen. Quasi-Monte Carlo uses a low-discrepancy sequence such as the Halton sequence, the Sobol sequence, or the Faure sequence, whereas Monte Carlo uses a pseudorandom sequence. The advantage of using low-discrepancy sequences is a faster rate of convergence. Quasi-Monte Carlo has a rate of convergence close to O(1/N), whereas the rate for the Monte Carlo method is O(N−0.5).

The Quasi-Monte Carlo method recently became popular in the area of mathematical finance or computational finance. In these areas, high-dimensional numerical integrals, where the integral should be evaluated within a threshold ε, occur frequently. Hence, the Monte Carlo method and the quasi-Monte Carlo method are beneficial in these situations.

Approximation error bounds of quasi-Monte Carlo 
The approximation error of the quasi-Monte Carlo method is bounded by a term proportional to the discrepancy of the set x1, ..., xN. Specifically, the Koksma–Hlawka inequality states that the error

is bounded by 

where V(f) is the Hardy–Krause variation of the function f (see Morokoff and Caflisch (1995)  for the detailed definitions). DN is the so-called star discrepancy of the set (x1,...,xN) and is defined as

where Q is a rectangular solid in [0,1]s with sides parallel to the coordinate axes. Thus, for sufficiently large , quasi-Monte Carlo will always outperform random Monte Carlo. However,  grows exponentially quickly with the dimension, meaning a poorly-chosen sequence can be much worse than Monte Carlo in high dimensions. In practice, it is almost always possible to select an appropriate low-discrepancy sequence, or apply an appropriate transformation to the integrand, to ensure that quasi-Monte Carlo performs at least as well as Monte Carlo (and often much better).

Monte Carlo and quasi-Monte Carlo for multidimensional integrations 

For one-dimensional integration, quadrature methods such as the trapezoidal rule, Simpson's rule, or Newton–Cotes formulas are known to be efficient if the function is smooth. These approaches can be also used for multidimensional integrations by repeating the one-dimensional integrals over multiple dimensions. However, the number of function evaluations grows exponentially as s, the number of dimensions, increases. Hence, a method that can overcome this curse of dimensionality should be used for multidimensional integrations. The standard Monte Carlo method is frequently used when the quadrature methods are difficult or expensive to implement. Monte Carlo and quasi-Monte Carlo methods are accurate and relatively fast when the dimension is high, up to 300 or higher.

Morokoff and Caflisch  studied the performance of Monte Carlo and quasi-Monte Carlo methods for integration. In the paper, Halton, Sobol, and Faure sequences for quasi-Monte Carlo are compared with the standard Monte Carlo method using pseudorandom sequences. They found that the Halton sequence performs best for dimensions up to around 6; the Sobol sequence performs best for higher dimensions; and the Faure sequence, while outperformed by the other two, still performs better than a pseudorandom sequence.

However, Morokoff and Caflisch  gave examples where the advantage of the quasi-Monte Carlo is less than expected theoretically. Still, in the examples studied by Morokoff and Caflisch, the quasi-Monte Carlo method did yield a more accurate result than the Monte Carlo method with the same number of points. Morokoff and Caflisch remark that the advantage of the quasi-Monte Carlo method is greater if the integrand is smooth, and the number of dimensions s of the integral is small.

Drawbacks of quasi-Monte Carlo 
Lemieux mentioned the drawbacks of quasi-Monte Carlo:
For large s and practical N values, the discrepancy of a point set from a low-discrepancy generator might be not smaller than for a random set.
 For many functions arising in practice,  (e.g. if Gaussian variables are used).
In order to overcome some of these difficulties, we can use a randomized quasi-Monte Carlo method.

Randomization of quasi-Monte Carlo 
Since the low discrepancy sequence are not random, but deterministic, quasi-Monte Carlo method can be seen as a deterministic algorithm or derandomized algorithm. In this case, we only have the bound (e.g., ε ≤ V(f) DN) for error, and the error is hard to estimate. In order to recover our ability to analyze and estimate the variance, we can randomize the method (see randomization for the general idea). The resulting method is called the randomized quasi-Monte Carlo method and can be also viewed as a variance reduction technique for the standard Monte Carlo method.  Among several methods, the simplest transformation procedure is through random shifting. Let {x1,...,xN} be the point set from the low discrepancy sequence. We sample s-dimensional random vector U and mix it with {x1, ..., xN}. In detail, for each xj, create

 

If we have R replications for Monte Carlo, sample s-dimensional random vector U for each replication. Randomization allows to give an estimate of the variance while still using quasi-random sequences. Compared to pure quasi Monte-Carlo, the number of samples of the quasi random sequence will be divided by R for an equivalent computational cost, which reduces the theoretical convergence rate. Compared to standard Monte-Carlo, the variance and the computation speed are slightly better from the experimental results in Tuffin (2008)

See also 

 Monte Carlo method
 Monte Carlo methods in finance
 Quasi-Monte Carlo methods in finance
 Biology Monte Carlo method
 Computational physics
 Low-discrepancy sequences
 Discrepancy theory
 Markov chain Monte Carlo

References 

 R. E. Caflisch, Monte Carlo and quasi-Monte Carlo methods, Acta Numerica vol. 7, Cambridge University Press, 1998, pp. 1–49.
 Josef Dick and Friedrich Pillichshammer, Digital Nets and Sequences. Discrepancy Theory and Quasi-Monte Carlo Integration, Cambridge University Press, Cambridge, 2010, 
 Gunther Leobacher and Friedrich Pillichshammer, Introduction to quasi-Monte Carlo Integration and Applications, Compact Textbooks in Mathematics, Birkhäuser, 2014, 
 Michael Drmota and Robert F. Tichy, Sequences, discrepancies and applications, Lecture Notes in Math., 1651, Springer, Berlin, 1997, 
 William J. Morokoff and Russel E. Caflisch, Quasi-random sequences and their discrepancies, SIAM J. Sci. Comput. 15 (1994), no. 6, 1251–1279 (At CiteSeer:)
 Harald Niederreiter. Random Number Generation and Quasi-Monte Carlo Methods. Society for Industrial and Applied Mathematics, 1992. 
 Harald G. Niederreiter, Quasi-Monte Carlo methods and pseudo-random numbers, Bull. Amer. Math. Soc. 84 (1978), no. 6, 957–1041
 Oto Strauch and Štefan Porubský, Distribution of Sequences: A Sampler, Peter Lang Publishing House, Frankfurt am Main 2005,

External links 
 The MCQMC Wiki page contains a lot of free online material on Monte Carlo and quasi-Monte Carlo methods
 A very intuitive and comprehensive introduction to Quasi-Monte Carlo methods

Monte Carlo methods
Low-discrepancy sequences